Herschel Junior Walker (born March 3, 1962) is an American former professional football player who was a running back in the National Football League (NFL) for 12 seasons. He was also the Republican nominee in the 2022 United States Senate election in Georgia.

Walker played college football at the University of Georgia, where he won the Heisman Trophy as a junior. He spent the first three seasons of his professional career with the New Jersey Generals of the United States Football League (USFL) and was the league's MVP during its final season in 1985. After the USFL folded, Walker joined the NFL with the Dallas Cowboys, earning consecutive Pro Bowl and second-team All-Pro honors from 1987 to 1988. In 1989, Walker was traded to the Minnesota Vikings, which is regarded as one of the most lopsided trades in NFL history and credited with establishing the Cowboys' dynasty of the 1990s. He was later a member of the Philadelphia Eagles and New York Giants before retiring with the Cowboys. Walker was inducted to the College Football Hall of Fame in 1999.

Outside of football, Walker was a member of the United States' bobsleigh team at the 1992 Winter Olympics and pursued business ventures in food processing. From 2019 to 2020, he served as a co-chair on the President's Council on Sports, Fitness, and Nutrition under President Donald Trump. Walker launched his first political campaign in Georgia's 2022 Senate election, which he lost to incumbent Democrat Raphael Warnock.

Early life and education
Walker was born in Augusta, Georgia, to Willis and Christine Walker. He was raised in Wrightsville, Georgia. He was one of seven children. Walker said that as a child, he was overweight and had a stutter.

Walker attended Johnson County High School in Wrightsville, where he played football, basketball, and competed in track. He played for the Johnson County Trojans high school football team from 1976 to 1979. In his senior year, he rushed for 3,167 yards, helping the Trojans win their first state championship. He was awarded the inaugural Dial Award as 1979 national high school scholar-athlete of the year.

Walker also competed on the Trojans track and field team in events ranging from the 100-yard dash to the shot put. He won the shot put, 100-yard dash, and 220-yard dash events at the Georgia High School Association T&F State Championships. He also anchored the 4×400 team to victory. 

In his 2008 autobiography, Walker wrote that he was the Beta Club president and class valedictorian at Johnson County High School. In December 2021, Walker's Senate campaign website claimed he graduated as the valedictorian of the entire high school, but CNN found no evidence for this claim. The claim on Walker's website was later removed and amended to state that Walker graduated high school "top of his class".

Starting in 2017, Walker has made the false claim that he had graduated from University of Georgia "in the top 1% of his class". In fact, he did not graduate, and left college to join the USFL. He did not return to complete his degree. In December 2021, Walker's Senate campaign website deleted the assertions about his education after The Atlanta Journal-Constitution inquired about it, with Walker acknowledging in a statement that he left the university without graduating to play professional football. Walker later falsely asserted he never said he graduated from the university.

Walker played running back and ran on the track and field team for the University of Georgia, where he was a three-time All-American (football and track) and winner of the 1982 Heisman Trophy and Maxwell Award. He is the first NCAA player who played only three years to finish in the top 10 in rushing yards, a mark later tied by Jonathan Taylor. During his freshman season in 1980, Walker set the NCAA freshman rushing record which was later broken by Taylor.  Walker finished third in Heisman voting. Walker was the first "true freshman" to become a first-team All-American.

College statistics

Professional career

United States Football League 
Walker signed with the New Jersey Generals in 1983, owned by Oklahoma oil tycoon J. Walter Duncan, who after the 1983 season sold the team to Donald Trump. Walker attracted only one major promotional offer, a joint project of McDonald's and Adidas.

National Football League

Dallas Cowboys (first stint)
The Dallas Cowboys, aware of Walker's earlier interest in playing for them, acquired Walker's NFL rights by selecting him in the fifth round (114th overall) of the 1985 NFL Draft.

In 1986, he was signed by the Cowboys and moved to fullback, so he could share backfield duties with Tony Dorsett, becoming the second Heisman backfield tandem in NFL history, after George Rogers and Earl Campbell teamed with the 1984 New Orleans Saints. This move created tension, as it would limit Dorsett's playing time, and because Walker's $5 million five-year contract exceeded his $4.5 million five-year contract. Walker rushed for the game-winning touchdown with a minute to play in the 31–28 victory against the New York Giants in the season opener. In the week 15 game against the Philadelphia Eagles, he had a franchise-record 292 yards of total offense, including the NFL's longest run of the year with an 84-yarder for a touchdown and an 84-yard touchdown reception.

In 1987, Walker complained to Cowboys management about being moved around between three different positions (running back, fullback, wide receiver) and that Dorsett had more carries. He would be the team's main running back, playing in 12 games (11 starts), while registering 891 rushing yards, 715 receiving yards, and 8 touchdowns. Dorsett played in 12 games (6 starts) and had two healthy DNP (Did Not Play), which would make him demand a trade that would send him to the Denver Broncos.

Walker established himself as an NFL running back in 1988, becoming a one-man offense, reaching his NFL career highs of 1,514 rushing yards and 505 receiving yards, while playing seven positions: halfback, fullback, tight end, H-back, wide receiver, both in the slot and as a flanker. He became the 10th player in NFL history to amass more than 2,000 combined rushing and receiving yards in a season. In the process he achieved two consecutive Pro Bowls (1987 and 1988).

In 1989, the Cowboys traded Walker to the Minnesota Vikings for a total of five players (linebacker Jesse Solomon, defensive back Issiac Holt, running back Darrin Nelson, linebacker David Howard, defensive end Alex Stewart) and six future draft picks. The five players were tied to potential draft picks Minnesota would give Dallas if a player was cut (which led to Emmitt Smith, Russell Maryland, Kevin Smith, and Darren Woodson).

Minnesota Vikings
Walker's trade to Minnesota was initially considered by many as supplying the Vikings with the "missing piece" for a Super Bowl run; however, over time, as the Cowboys' fortunes soared and the Vikings' waned, it became viewed as, perhaps, the most lopsided trade in NFL history. From the moment he arrived in Minneapolis, "Herschel Mania" erupted. After a 2½ hour practice where he studied 12 offensive plays, Walker debuted against the Green Bay Packers.

He received three standing ovations from the record Metrodome crowd of 62,075, producing a Vikings win after four successive losses and 14 of the prior 18 games with the Packers. Scout.com says, "Walker was never used properly by the coaching brain trust." "Herschel the Turkey", a mock honor given out by the Star Tribune newspaper to inept Minnesota sports personalities, is named for him.

Philadelphia Eagles
After three seasons in Minnesota, the Philadelphia Eagles signed Walker in 1992 hoping he would help them reach the Super Bowl. That year, he rushed for 1,070 yards. In 1994 he became the first NFL player to have one-play gains of 90 or more yards rushing, receiving and kick-returning in a single season. He spent three seasons in Philadelphia, leaving after the Eagles signed free agent Ricky Watters.

New York Giants
The New York Giants signed Walker in 1995 to a three-year contract worth $4.8 million as a third-down back. Walker led the Giants with 45 kick returns at 21.5 yards per return in 1995, his only season with the team.

Dallas Cowboys (second stint)
In 1996, he rejoined the Dallas Cowboys as a kickoff return specialist and third-down back. He also played fullback, but primarily as a ball-handler instead of a blocker out of I-Form and pro-sets. Walker retired at the end of the 1997 season.

Professional statistics

USFL

NFL

Other athletic and competitive activities
In 1992, Walker competed in the Winter Olympics in Albertville, France as a member of the United States' bobsleigh team. Originally selected for the four-man team, he eventually competed as the brakeman (or pusher) in the two-man competition. Walker and his teammate Brian Shimer placed seventh.

In November 2007, Walker appeared on the HDNet show Inside MMA as a guest. He indicated he would take part in a mixed martial arts reality show in the near future (along with José Canseco) and that he would have an official MMA fight at the conclusion of the show. In September 2009, it was announced that Walker had been signed by MMA promotion company Strikeforce to compete in their heavyweight division at the age of 47.

He began a 12-week training camp with trainer "Crazy" Bob Cook at the American Kickboxing Academy in October 2009 in San Jose, California. In his MMA debut on January 30, 2010, Walker defeated Greg Nagy via technical knock-out due to strikes at Strikeforce: Miami.

In 2009, Walker was a contestant in the second season of the reality television show The Celebrity Apprentice.

Strikeforce confirmed that Walker would face former WEC fighter Scott Carson when he made his second appearance in the Strikeforce cage. Walker was forced off the Strikeforce card on December 4 due to a cut suffered in training that required seven stitches. They fought instead on January 29, 2011, and Walker defeated Carson via TKO (strikes) at 3:13 of round 1.

In 2014, Walker won season 3 of Rachael vs. Guy: Celebrity Cook-Off.

Walker has a fifth-degree black belt in taekwondo.

Business activities
In 1984, Walker franchised a D'Lites fast food restaurant in Athens, Georgia.

In 2002, Walker created Renaissance Man Food Services, which distributes chicken products. Originally, his producer was Sysco Corp. following a casual conversation with a Sysco vice president who asked him to provide some chicken-breading recipes from his mother. He founded Savannah-based H. Walker Enterprises in 2002 as an umbrella company for most of his other business ventures, the largest of which was Renaissance Man Food Services.

Walker has a history of exaggerating the number of people employed by and the assets of his companies; the failure of several business enterprises led to creditors bringing lawsuits. Walker touted Renaissance Man Food Services as one of the largest minority-owned meat processors in the nation, with $70 million in annual sales. In subsequent deposition testimony in a lawsuit, however, Walker gave far lower figures, saying that his company averaged about $1.5 million in annual profits from 2008 and 2017.

Walker has touted Renaissance Man Food Services as a "mini-Tyson Foods", and also said that the company controlled multiple chicken processing plants. However, in a 2018 declaration submitted in a legal case against his company, Walker acknowledged that the company did not actually own any chicken processing plants and instead partnered with plant owners to sell branded chicken products. Walker's business associates later testified that Walker licensed his name to the chicken-related enterprise.

In 2009, Walker told the media that Renaissance Man Food Services had over 100 employees. In 2018, Walker told the media that Renaissance Man Food Services had "over 600 employees." In 2020, Renaissance Man Food Services informed the U.S. government that it had eight employees. The Atlanta Journal-Constitution suggested that Walker's overestimate of employees could "refer to chicken processing jobs, which are not actually part of Walker's business".

In April 2020, Renaissance Man Food Services applied for a Paycheck Protection Program (PPP) loan due to the economic impact of the COVID-19 pandemic, and the company ultimately received two PPP loans totaling $180,000 (of which $111,300 was forgiven). On Twitter in April 2020, Walker mocked "big companies" that received PPP money, suggesting that they were "giving back" the money due to being "ashamed". This was despite Walker being a board member of the Sotherly Hotel Group, owner of the Georgian Terrace Hotel and other hotels; the group received over $9 million of PPP loans in April 2020 while firing 90% of its hotel staff, according to company documents submitted to the U.S. government. According to government records, Walker was paid $247,227 in total from Sotherly from 2016 to 2021.

Walker said that "part of its corporate charter" was to donate 15% of profits to charities. However, none of the four charities that Walker named as beneficiaries confirmed they actually received any donations.

Political activities

In 2014, Walker appeared in a commercial paid for by the United States Chamber of Commerce supporting Jack Kingston's bid in the Republican primary election for the 2014 U.S. Senate election in Georgia. In 2018, Walker endorsed Republican Brian Kemp in the 2018 Georgia gubernatorial election.

Walker supported Donald Trump in the 2016 and 2020 presidential elections, and spoke on Trump's behalf at the 2020 Republican National Convention. In 2018, Trump appointed Walker to the President's Council on Sports, Fitness, and Nutrition. Trump reappointed him to another two year-term on December 17, 2020. He was removed from the position in March 2022 by President Biden after he was asked to resign. In 2020, Walker endorsed U.S. Senator Kelly Loeffler.

2022 U.S. Senate election in Georgia

In 2021, Donald Trump encouraged Walker to run for the U.S. Senate in Georgia. Walker, a Texas resident, needed to re-establish residency in Georgia to do so. Walker's contemplation of entering the race "froze" the Republican field because other prospective candidates for the nomination waited for his decision. In July 2021, Fox News reported that some Georgia Republicans were not sure how effective a candidate Walker would be, citing the fact that his positions on issues of importance to Republican voters were unknown.

In August 2021, Walker announced his run for the Senate seat held by Democrat Raphael Warnock. Walker began his campaign with high favorability ratings and support from self-identified moderate Republicans, and, in October 2021, was endorsed by Senate Minority Leader Mitch McConnell, in a sign that the Republican establishment was lining up behind him.

In June 2022, The Atlanta Journal-Constitution found Walker's claims about working in law enforcement were either false or unverifiable. Walker has been named as an honorary deputy sheriff in Cobb County and Johnson County.  In 2019, Walker said he "spent time at Quantico at the FBI training school" and was "an agent" when, in reality, Walker lacked the bachelor's degree required for FBI training. Previously, in 1989, Walker told the media that he "had fun" while attending an FBI school in Quantico for a week, speaking of an "obstacle course and you shoot at targets".

Many of Walker's statements on the campaign trail have been described as "gaffes" or "head-scratching at best". In an editorial for CNN, Chris Cillizza described Walker as a "walking gaffe machine", in which he disputed several statements Walker had made.

On October 5, 2022, Walker's campaign fired Taylor Crowe, his campaign political director, over suspicions that he leaked information to the media.

On October 14, 2022, Walker and his Democratic challenger, Raphael Warnock, faced off in their only debate for the Senate election.  The New York Times described Walker's demeanor throughout the debate as "aggressive and persistent," with his frequent interruptions of Warnock and mocking of him for dodging questions. Walker repeatedly tried to link Warnock with President Joe Biden, who carried a low approval rating. During a portion of the debate focusing on crime, Walker revealed what appeared to be a law enforcement badge to illustrate his closeness to law enforcement; the move was admonished by the moderators since props were not allowed for the debate. The Hill wrote Walker won a "moral victory by avoiding disaster" and "more than avoided embarrassment."

In a mid-November 2022 campaign speech, Walker discussed watching a film about a vampire, whom he compared to Warnock with a "black suit". The film showed a person failing to defeat the vampire, said Walker, because of a lack of "faith". Walker made a call to "have faith in our fellow brothers ... have faith in the elected officials ... that's the reason I'm here ... I'm that warrior that y'all have been looking for". Also during that speech, Walker said: "A werewolf can kill a vampire ... So, I don't want to be a vampire any more. I want to be a werewolf."

Since no candidate received a majority of the vote in the general election on November 8, 2022, he faced incumbent Democrat Raphael Warnock in a runoff election on December 6, and lost. Walker conceded the election that night, stating: "I'm not going to make any excuses now because we put up one heck of a fight. [...] I want you to continue to believe in this country, believe in our elected officials, and most of all, stay together".

Political positions

2020 presidential election 

After Joe Biden won the 2020 presidential election, Walker tweeted a video supporting Trump's efforts to overturn the election results. Walker has spread many conspiracy theories about the 2020 presidential election. Walker claimed that Biden "didn't get 50 million" votes; Biden indeed received over 80 million votes. Walker alleged that there was "country-wide election fraud" without any evidence and urged Trump and "true patriots" to carry out "a total cleansing" to "prosecute all the bad actors". He urged re-votes in the states of Arizona, Georgia, Michigan, Nevada, North Carolina, Pennsylvania and Wisconsin. Walker also spread a conspiracy theory about the 2021 United States Capitol attack, suggesting it was a "well-planned" distraction from election fraud.

In July 2022, when asked whether Joe Biden had fairly defeated Donald Trump in Georgia, Walker replied, "I have no clue." In the October debate with Warnock, when asked if Joe Biden was the winner of the 2020 election, Walker stated, "President Biden won and Raphael Warnock won."

Abortion 

In May 2022, Walker stated he opposes abortion, and wants no exceptions to abortion bans. He also called for more money to promote adoption and to support single parents. "You never know what a child is going to become. And I've seen some people, they've had some tough times, but I always said, 'No matter what, tough times make tough people. When asked about the impact of the issue on the November 2022 election, Walker described abortion rights as among the "things that people are not concerned about". In September 2022, Walker endorsed legislation proposed by Senator Lindsey Graham that would ban abortion after 15 weeks of pregnancy nationwide, except in cases of rape, incest, and threat to the life of the patient. During his October debate with Raphael Warnock, Walker softened his position on abortion, saying he supported the Georgia law allowing exceptions for rape and threats to the mother's life and health.

Economy 

Walker favors reducing federal regulations to boost business. He supports widespread tax cuts, building the Keystone Pipeline and increasing production of fossil fuels. He proposes to "lower healthcare costs by increasing competitive market options". Walker supports putting closed oil fields back into production and rolling back oil-field regulations in order to reduce inflation.

Environment and climate change 
When asked about the Green New Deal environmental program, Walker said that he opposed it because "Since we don't control the air our good air decided to float over to China's bad air so when China gets our good air, their bad air got to move. So it moves over to our good air space. Then now we got we to clean that back up." In August 2022, in response to questions about the passage of the Inflation Reduction Act of 2022, which includes funding to counteract climate change, Walker said, "They continue to try to fool you that they are helping you out. But they're not". Possibly referring to a provision that allocated $1.5 billion to the U.S. Forest Service's Urban and Community Forestry Program, Walker added, "Because a lot of money, it's going to trees. Don't we have enough trees around here?" Walker told supporters at a November 2022 rally that America isn't "ready for the green agenda. ... What we need to do is keep having those gas-guzzling cars. We got the good emissions under those cars".

Gun control and school shootings 

When asked in May 2022 on how to tackle gun violence, Walker said: "Cain killed Abel and that's a problem that we have. What we need to do is look into how we can stop those things." Walker then suggested "getting a department that can look at young men that's looking at women, that's looking at their social media", and also by "putting money into the mental health field ... rather than departments that want to take away your rights." When asked if he supported new gun laws in the wake of the Uvalde school shooting, Walker responded: "What I like to do is see it and everything and stuff."

LGBT rights 

Walker opposes allowing transgender athletes to compete in women's sports events, stating in September 2022: "Let's get men out of women's sports". Walker also discussed transgender children in general, stating, "they're telling the young kids in school, you can be a boy tomorrow even if you're a girl... But I want the young kids to know you go to heaven. Jesus may not recognize you. Because he made you a boy. He made you a girl."

Asked about same-sex marriage, Walker said states should be free to decide the legality of same-sex marriage.

National security 

Walker supports Donald Trump's wall at the border with Mexico. He wants the United States to "heavily invest" in the military.

Personal life
Walker has lived in Westlake, Texas and in the Las Colinas area of Irving, Texas.

In August 2021, as he was preparing to run for U.S. Senate, Walker registered to vote in Georgia and listed his residence as Buckhead, Georgia; the property is owned by his wife Julie Blanchard. However, in a January 2022 political campaign event, Walker said: "I live in Texas … I was sitting in my home in Texas …" Tax records also show that Walker's primary residence for 2021 and 2022 is still registered as Tarrant County, Texas, where he continues to receive property tax breaks.

Relationships and children
Walker married Cindy DeAngelis Grossman, whom he met in college, in 1983. They have a son, Christian, a social media influencer who went viral for his conservative rants. After 19 years of marriage, Walker and Grossman divorced in 2002. Julie Blanchard in 2012 said that she was Walker's fiancée; Walker married Blanchard in 2021.

Walker has two additional sons and a daughter whom he did not publicly acknowledge before his 2022 US Senate campaign; he did so in June 2022, one day after The Daily Beast reported on one of his additional sons. Walker said that month, during a conference, that he "never denied" having four children. The Daily Beast later reported that Walker had lied to his 2022 Senate campaign about how many children he had, while The Atlanta Journal-Constitution reported "allies to Walker" stating that Walker had not been honest about how many children he had. Walker said that he did not publicly acknowledge his children to prevent exposing them to unwanted attention, and criticized the claim that "I hide my children because I don't discuss them with reporters to win a campaign". Earlier during his Senate campaigning, Walker repeatedly discussed his relationship with eldest son Christian.

Prior to publicly acknowledging his other children, in a 2020 interview, Walker said that fatherless households were a "major, major problem" in African-American communities. In October 2022, Walker's adult son Christian criticized Walker, stating, "my favorite issue to talk about is father absence. Surprise! Because it affected me. ... He has four kids, four different women. Wasn't in the house raising one of them. He was out having sex with other women." Also in October 2022, the mother of another of Walker's sons (born in 2012), said that Walker had seen his son "maybe ... three times", with Walker's parenting contributions mostly being court-ordered child support and sporadic gifts, while suggesting that the gifts were actually from Walker's fiancée/wife Julie Blanchard, and not from him.

Domestic violence allegations
In September 2001, when Walker and Grossman were estranged, an Irving, Texas, police report stated that police were called to Grossman's home by Walker's therapist due to Walker's visit there; Walker was "volatile", had a weapon, and was scaring Grossman. The report stated that Walker "talked about having a shoot-out with police"; the therapist, Jerry Mungadze, defused the situation after speaking to Walker for at least half an hour. The report stated that police confiscated a SIG Sauer handgun from Walker's car, put his home on a "caution list" due to Walker's “violent tendencies", but did not arrest or charge Walker. In a separate incident, Mungadze told the media that when he conducted a therapy session with Walker and Grossman, he called 911 because Walker "threatened to kill" all three of them, prompting the police to arrive; the result of the incident was Walker hitting a door, breaking his fist.

In filing for divorce in December 2001, Grossman accused him of "physically abusive and extremely threatening behavior." After the divorce, she told the media that, during their marriage, Walker pointed a pistol at her head and said: "I'm going to blow your f'ing brains out." She also said he had used knives to threaten her. In 2005, a restraining order was imposed on Walker regarding Grossman, after Grossman's sister stated in an affidavit that Walker told her "unequivocally that he was going to shoot my sister Cindy and her [new] boyfriend in the head." As a result, a temporary gun-owning ban was also issued to Walker by a judge. Walker stated that he does not remember the assault or the threats and attributed his aberrant behavior with his wife and others to his dissociative identity disorder for which he was diagnosed in 2001.

In January 2012, a woman, Myka Dean, made a report to Irving, Texas, police that when she attempted to end a 20-year "on-off" relationship with Walker, he "lost it" and threatened to wait at her home to "blow her head off". The responding police officer described this as "extreme threats". Federal records show that Dean, as well as her mother and stepfather, were business partners of Walker's, for his company Renaissance Man Inc. Dean died in 2019; Walker's 2022 political campaign stated that the allegations in the 2012 police report were false, and that Walker still had a good relationship with Dean's parents.

In October 2022, Walker's adult son Christian publicly accused Walker of having threatened to kill him and his mother. He addressed Walker on Twitter, stating: "You're not a 'family man' when you left us to bang a bunch of women, threatened to kill us, and had us move over 6 times in 6 months running from your violence ... how DARE YOU LIE and act as though you're some 'moral, Christian, upright man' ... You've lived a life of DESTROYING other peoples lives." Soon after Christian made the allegations, Walker wrote on Twitter that he loved his son "no matter what".

In December 2022, The Daily Beast reported that Cheryl Parsa, an ex-girlfriend of Walker who lives in Dallas, had alleged that in 2005, during their relationship, she found Walker with another woman. According to Parsa, Walker got angry, put his hands on Parsa's neck and chest, and swung a fist at her.

Abortion allegations

On October 3, 2022, The Daily Beast published allegations from a woman who said that Walker impregnated her and paid for her abortion in 2009 when they were dating. The woman supported the allegation by producing images of a personal check from Walker, a get-well card with Walker's purported signature, and a $575 receipt for an abortion. The Daily Beast said that it corroborated the story with a friend of the woman, who "took care of her in the days after the procedure". Walker stated, "I never asked anyone to get an abortion. I never paid for an abortion." When asked about the check, Walker said, "I give money to people all the time, because I'm always helping people". Walker said he would sue The Daily Beast for defamation. After Walker said on October 5 that he did not know the identity of the woman accusing him, The Daily Beast reported that the woman is the mother of one of Walker's children; she told The Daily Beast that she had another child with Walker years after the abortion, despite Walker stating that it was not a convenient time for him to have a child, a sentiment he also raised prior to the abortion.

Within a week of the original allegations' publication, The New York Times interviewed the same woman, as well as her friend, corroborating the reporting by The Daily Beast. The woman additionally told The New York Times that she ended her relationship with Walker when he advised her to have a second abortion in 2011. Family court records in New York confirm that Walker and the woman had a son, who was born in 2012. On October 7, 2022, Walker acknowledged that his accuser was the mother of his son, and as to whether she had an abortion, Walker said: "I'm not saying she did or didn't have one [an abortion]. I'm saying I don't know anything about that." He acknowledged the possibility of having given his accuser a 'get well' card and a check for other reasons, but said he could not remember doing so.

In an October 26, 2022, press conference organized by attorney Gloria Allred, a second woman, who has not identified herself, alleged she had been pressured by Walker to get an abortion in 1993 after a years-long extramarital relationship with him. Walker denied the allegation, saying it was a "lie". On November 22, Allred held another press conference, where the second woman also spoke, and audio recordings of Walker were shared. The woman read out letters that she said Walker wrote, including one to her which stated: "I’m sorry I have put you through all this stuff." Allred read out a signed declaration of a friend of the second woman, which stated that the second woman originally said that she had a miscarriage, but the friend suspected that it was an abortion because the friend knew that Walker was married at the time and did not want to have a child with the second woman; years later, the second woman told the friend that Walker actually sent her to a clinic for an abortion.

Mental health issues

Walker has spoken publicly about being diagnosed with dissociative identity disorder and has served as spokesperson for a mental health treatment program for veterans. Walker says he wrote the 2008 book Breaking Free: My Life with Dissociative Identity Disorder to help dispel myths about mental illness and to help others.

In the book, Walker wrote that he had a dozen distinct identities, or alters. According to Walker, some of his alters did many good things, but other alters exhibited extreme and violent behavior, which Walker said he mostly could not remember. A competitive alter caused him to play Russian roulette in 1991, as he saw "mortality as the ultimate challenge", he wrote. He was formally diagnosed with the disorder in 2001, after he sought professional help for being tempted to murder a man who was late in delivering a car to him.

Walker attributed his divorce to his behavior caused by the disorder. According to Walker's ex-wife, for the first 16 years of their marriage, Walker's alters were somehow controlled, and she had no idea that he had any disorder. Grossman said that the situation greatly deteriorated once Walker was diagnosed, after which he began to exhibit either "very sweet" alters or "very violent" alters who looked "evil". She said that in one situation where Walker exhibited two alters, she was in bed when he held a straight razor to her throat and repeatedly stated that he would kill her. Walker did not deny Grossman's account, saying that he did not remember it, because blackouts were a symptom of the disorder.

While receiving treatment for dissociative identity disorder in May 2002, Walker was the subject of an Irving, Texas, police report made by a friend of Grossman, Walker's ex-wife. She said that he followed her home and that she was "very frightened" of Walker, but did not want police to make contact with him as it would "only make the problem worse." She reported previously having a "confrontation" with Walker sometime around 2001, which was followed by Walker calling her to threaten her and "having her house watched".

Awards and honors
On July 4, 2017, during Wrightsville's annual Fourth of July celebration and parade, Trojan Way, the street where Johnson County High School resides, was officially renamed Herschel Walker Drive.

In the 1980s, the American Academy of Achievement awarded Walker their Golden Plate Award for being an All-American Football Player.

NFL
 Two-time Pro Bowl selection

USFL
 1985 USFL MVP

NCAA
 1980 National champion
 1982 Heisman Trophy winner
 1982 UPI College Football Player of the Year
 Three-time Unanimous All-American
 Georgia Bulldogs No. 34 retired
 College Football Hall of Fame (class of 1999)

Electoral history

See also
 Black conservatism in the United States
 List of Strikeforce alumni

Notes

References

External links

 Senate campaign website
 
 

1962 births
Living people
20th-century African-American sportspeople
African-American players of American football
African-American Christians
All-American college football players
American conspiracy theorists
American football running backs
American football return specialists
American male taekwondo practitioners
American male mixed martial artists
The Apprentice (franchise) contestants
Bobsledders at the 1992 Winter Olympics
Black conservatism in the United States
Candidates in the 2022 United States Senate elections
College Football Hall of Fame inductees
Critics of Black Lives Matter
Dallas Cowboys players
Georgia Bulldogs football players
Georgia (U.S. state) Republicans
Heisman Trophy winners
Maxwell Award winners
Minnesota Vikings players
National Conference Pro Bowl players
New Jersey Generals players
New York Giants players
Participants in American reality television series
People from Johnson County, Georgia
American people who fabricated academic degrees
People with dissociative identity disorder
Philadelphia Eagles players
Players of American football from Georgia (U.S. state)
Texas Republicans
United States Football League MVPs